Mom Jeans (stylized Mom Jeans.) is an American alternative rock/indie rock band formed in Berkeley, California in 2014.

History
Mom Jeans found their start in early 2014 at UC Berkeley, with guitarist Austin Carango and lead singer Eric Butler. This line-up would go on to record Spring Demo in May 2014, a six-track EP which would later be released as the band's self-titled debut on cassette tape by Northern California-based label, Fourth Row Records. Tracks on Spring Demo feature only Eric and Austin in an acoustic style, while the later released self-titled EP boasted an electric instrumentation with new additions, Josh Perline on bass/vocals, and David McDowall on drums (before his departure from the band shortly after release). Later that summer, the trio would record their last EP before their first full-length album, titled Allergic which featured Austin switching to drums, Josh switching to guitar, and bass recordings being handled by both members. Post-release, Gabriel (Gabe) Paganin joined the band as live bassist and Josh Perline exited the band on good terms.

Mom Jeans self-released their first full-length album, Best Buds, on July 3, 2016. Like their self-titled EP, the album was first released on cassette tape by Fourth Row Records in the summer of 2016. However, soon the group would sign with Massachusetts-based label Counter Intuitive Records, who then re-released the band's first full-length album on vinyl in November 2016.  

On March 7, 2017, Mom Jeans released a split EP with the Fresno-based band Graduating Life. It was during this period that Bart Thompson of Graduating Life and Meet Me in Montauk fame would become a guitarist for the band. 

On October 6, 2017, Counter Intuitive Records released a split EP titled NOW That's What I Call Music Vol. 420, featuring music from Mom Jeans as well as the bands Pictures of Vernon and Prince Daddy & The Hyena. 

Also in October 2017, the band announced they had signed with SideOneDummy Records, and had plans to release their second album through the label in 2018. However, in a reddit post, Eric Butler confirmed that they would no longer be working with the label and instead continue to work with Counter Intuitive Records to release their second album.

The band's second full-length album, titled Puppy Love, was released on July 3, 2018 with Counter Intuitive Records, as well as a limited independent label run of the record and a select variant being put out by UK based label Big Scary Monsters. 

In early 2019 the band began recording demos for a new LP as well as naming the album, which will be titled Sweet Tooth., following the departure of Gabriel Paganin. In fall of 2019 it was announced the band would be touring with Hobo Johnson, featuring guest bassist Billy Bouzos (owner of the Oakland-based indie label Slang Church) filling in for Sam Kless. Sweet Tooth was released on February 25, 2022, with the first single What's Up? being released on September 28, 2021.

Band members
Current members
Eric Butler – vocals, guitar, trombone (2014–present)
Austin Carango – drums, trumpet (2014–present)
Bart Thompson – guitar, vocals (2017–present)
Sam Kless – bass (2019–present)

Past members
 Josh Perline – guitar, bass
 Matt Falls – drums
 Gabriel Paganin – bass
 Billy Bouzos – bass

Discography
Studio albums
 Best Buds (2016)
 Puppy Love (2018)
 Sweet Tooth (2022)

EPs
 Mom Jeans/Graduating Life Split EP (2017, Riff castle records, Counter Intuitive Records)
 Mom Jeans/Prince Daddy & The Hyena/Pictures of Vernon - "NOW That's What I Call Music Vol. 420" (2017, Counter Intuitive Records)

References

Musical groups from Berkeley, California
Musical groups established in 2014
2014 establishments in California
American emo musical groups
Emo revival groups
Big Scary Monsters Recording Company artists